= Saprozoonosis =

Form of zoonosis

Saprozoonosis (sap′ro-zo-o-no′sis) is a form of zoonosis in which its agent needs both a vertebrate host, as well as a nonanimal site, such as soil, plant or food, in order to complete its life cycle.

Some combination terms are used to describe particular types of saprozoonoses. They include saprometazoonoses, for cases where larvae of flukes encyst on plants, and saprocyclozoonoses, in the case of tick infestations, where part of the life cycle of the agent takes place in soil.
